Sutherland is a town with about 2,841 inhabitants in the Northern Cape province of South Africa. It lies in the western Roggeveld Mountains in the Karoo.

History 
Sutherland was founded in 1855 as a church and market town to serve the area's sheep farmers.  By 1872 the town had a population of 138 registered citizens living in 19 houses. The large Dutch Reformed church in the centre of Sutherland was built in 1899.

During the Anglo Boer War the church was used as a fort by garrisoned British soldiers.  During the war a number of engagements between British and Boer forces occurred in the town.  In one such engagement a force of 250 Boer commandos attacked the local British garrison for 10 hours.  The ruins of a fort can be found on the outskirts of town on the hill called Rebelskop. This was named after this engagement.

Economy 
Major economic activities include tourism and sheep farming. The area includes at least twelve registered B&B's, guest houses and guest farms. The nearby South African Astronomical Observatory also plays a significant role in the town's economy and is a major driver of tourism to the area. The town also has a number of bars, restaurants and an amateur astronomy observatory that service the tourism sector.

Sutherland has recently gained in popularity, with many Capetonians buying property in the town and many more visiting on weekends and vacations.

Geography
These include the Southern African Large Telescope (SALT), the largest single optical telescope in the southern hemisphere.

Climate

The South African Prince Edward Islands have experienced significantly lower temperatures, however, these islands have sub-Antarctic, highland climates and are located well to the southeast of mainland South Africa.

Sutherland has a semi-arid climate (Köppen climate classification BSk).

The climate record is sparse; the data below is drawn from the 2017-2020 records.

Notable residents 
Notable residents of Sutherland include:
 NP van Wyk Louw, famous Afrikaner poet and elder brother of WEG Louw was born in Sutherland.
 WEG Louw, famous Afrikaner poet and younger brother of NP van Wyk Louw was born in Sutherland.
 Dr Henry Olivier, chief engineer of the Kariba Dam project and contributing inventor of the Mulberry Harbours was born in Sutherland.
 Adriaan Vlok, national government minister of Law and Order from 1986 to 1991 was born in Sutherland.
 André van der Merwe, a famous South African urologist born in Sutherland.

See also 
 South African Astronomical Observatory
 Southern African Large Telescope

References

External links 
 South African Astronomical Observatory website
 Discover Sutherland
 
 Sutherland on www.karoo-southafrica.co.za

Populated places in the Karoo Hoogland Local Municipality
Karoo
Populated places established in 1858
1858 establishments in the British Empire